Santa Catarina is one of twelve civil parishes (freguesias) in the municipality of Caldas da Rainha, Portugal.

Its main economic activities are leather goods industry, construction, agriculture, horticulture, livestock production, trade, but it is its cutlery industry that makes Santa Catarina known internationally.

Villages 

Peso
Vigia
Cumeira
Mouraria
Casal do Rio
Casal do Bicho
Quinta da Ferraria
Casal das Freiras
Casal dos Nortes
Casal da Coita
Portela
Abrunheira
Casal da Marinha
Casal da Azenha
Casal das Penas
Mata de Porto Mouro
Relvas
Granja Nova
Casal da Cruz
Casal Torcano

Cultural Heritage 
Parish church
Mansion-house
Pillory
Ancient hillfort
Public garden
Mestras forest
Chapels

External links 
 Official Website (in Portuguese)

References

Freguesias of Caldas da Rainha